Henry Frederick Thynne, 6th Marquess of Bath  (26 January 1905 – 30 June 1992), styled Lord Henry Thynne until 1916 and Viscount Weymouth between 1916 and 1946, was a British aristocrat, landowner, and Conservative Party politician.

Background and education
Lord Bath was the second son of Thomas Thynne, 5th Marquess of Bath, and Violet Mordaunt, the illegitimate daughter of Harriet Mordaunt and Lowry Cole, 4th Earl of Enniskillen. He was educated at the New Beacon School, Sevenoaks, Harrow, and Christ Church, Oxford. In 1916 he became the heir apparent to his father’s estates and peerages after his elder brother, John, was killed in action in the First World War.

At Oxford, Thynne was part of the Railway Club, which included: Henry Yorke, Roy Harrod, David Plunket Greene, Harry Fox-Strangways, Brian Howard, Michael Rosse, John Sutro, Hugh Lygon, Harold Acton, Bryan Guinness, Patrick Balfour, Mark Ogilvie-Grant, and John Drury-Lowe.

In the 1920s the tabloid press considered him one of the Bright Young Things.

Political and military careers
As Viscount Weymouth, he was elected as the Member of Parliament (MP) for Frome between 1931 and 1935, and served as a member of the Council of the Duchy of Cornwall from 1933 to 1936 and Justice of the Peace for Wiltshire in 1938.

He gained the rank of major in the service of the Royal Wiltshire Yeomanry, fought in the Second World War, and was awarded the Bronze Star.

Thynne succeeded his father as Marquess of Bath in 1946. He was noted for his forestry work on the ancestral estate of Longleat. It was he who developed the safari park and opened the house to the public in 1949.

From 1960 onwards he amassed what would become the largest collection of paintings by Adolf Hitler, numbering sixty by 1983. To some extent an admirer of Hitler, the Marquess is quoted as saying “Hitler did a hell of a lot for his country”.

Family
On 27 October 1927, Lord Weymouth married, first, Daphne Vivian, daughter of George Vivian, 4th Baron Vivian. Before divorcing, in 1953, they had five children:

 Lady Caroline Jane Thynne (1928–1995); married David Somerset, 11th Duke of Beaufort, and had issue.
 The Honourable Thomas Timothy Thynne (1929–1930); died in infancy.
 Alexander George Thynn, 7th Marquess of Bath (1932–2020); married Anna Gyarmathy and had issue.
 Lord Christopher John Thynne (1934–2017); married Antonia Palmer, daughter of Sir Anthony Palmer, 4th Baronet, and had issue.
 Lord Valentine Charles Thynne (1937–1979); married, first, Veronica Jacks and had issue. He married, secondly, Susanne Alder; and, thirdly, Liese Dennis.

After becoming Lord Bath he married, secondly, Virginia Penelope Parsons (1917–2003), on 15 July 1953, following her divorce earlier that year from David Tennant. They had one daughter:

 Lady Silvy Cerne Thynne (b. 22 December 1958); married Iain McQuiston and has issue. A sister-in-law of the current Marchioness of Bath.

References

External links 
 

1905 births
1992 deaths
6
Henry
People educated at Harrow School
Alumni of Christ Church, Oxford
Conservative Party (UK) hereditary peers
Thynne, Henry
Thynne, Henry
British Army personnel of World War II
Royal Wiltshire Yeomanry officers
20th-century English nobility